Robert McClure (March 24, 1891 – September 6, 1931), nicknamed "Big Boy", was an American Negro league pitcher between 1920 and 1930.

A native of Egypt, Texas, McClure made his Negro leagues debut in 1920 for the Indianapolis ABCs. He went on to play for the Cleveland Tate Stars, Baltimore Black Sox, and Bacharach Giants, and finished his career with the Brooklyn Royal Giants in 1930. McClure died in Baltimore, Maryland in 1931 at age 40.

References

External links
 and Baseball-Reference Black Baseball stats and Seamheads

1891 births
1931 deaths
Bacharach Giants players
Baltimore Black Sox players
Brooklyn Royal Giants players
Cleveland Tate Stars players
Indianapolis ABCs players
20th-century African-American sportspeople
Baseball pitchers